Charles A. McGeehan (1878 – May 30, 1933) was an American football player and coach of football and baseball.  He served as the head football coach at Villanova College—now known as Villanova University—for one season, in 1912, tallying a mark of 3–3.  McGeehan was also the head baseball coach at Villanova from 1912 to 1932, compiling a record of 209–151–3.  McGeehan's brother, Hugh McGeehan, served as Villanova's head football coach in 1923.

Head coaching record

Football

References

1878 births
1933 deaths
Villanova Wildcats athletic directors
Villanova Wildcats baseball coaches
Villanova Wildcats football coaches
Villanova Wildcats football players
Sportspeople from Edinburgh
British emigrants to the United States